Richard "Richie" Mirando, known as Seen UA (born 1961) is an American graffiti artist. He is one of the best known graffiti artists in the world and has been referred to as the Godfather of Graffiti.

Seen first started to paint on the New York City Subway system in 1973. His crew, United Artists (or simply UA), which included Duster, Sin, and his brother Mad, painted whole cars.

He was born in the Bronx, New York City.

Life
For the next 16 years he painted pieces across the city and on all subway routes, but they were especially prominent on the 2, 5, and 6 trains. He was responsible for dozens of whole-car top-to-bottoms, many of which have become iconic images of the time.

During the very early 1980s Seen started producing work on canvas, shown by galleries and bought by museums and private collectors worldwide. These included not only solo exhibitions but also group shows with artists Keith Haring, Andy Warhol, Jean-Michel Basquiat, Dondi, Quik, Blade, and Lee Quiñones. Despite such success and constant world travel, Seen continued to paint New York City subway trains until 1989, long after increased pressure from the MTA had stopped many from doing so. He was included in the 1983 PBS documentary Style Wars.

In the late 1980s Seen also undertook tattoo art, opening Tattoo Seen, a tattoo parlor which became one of the most successful studios in New York City. Seen's more recent work includes three-dimensional sculpture, mixed media work with reclaimed or discarded materials (often found in the street), and a series of hand-painted MTA New York subway maps. He continues to exhibit worldwide and produce work with and alongside artists such as Banksy.

In 2009, the Seen Gallery opened in Paris before becoming the Seen Studios, France. He also has been exhibited at the Fondation Cartier.

In 2010, Seen had a solo exhibition at Magda Danysz Gallery. In 2011, he signed on with Opera Gallery (12 locations worldwide), and its Paris gallery exhibited his work.

Seen's Throw ups/pieces can be seen in digital video-games The Warriors, Marc Eckō's Getting Up: Contents Under Pressure and Grand Theft Auto V.

He has focused on painting comic book heroes. He has his own clothing line that prints t-shirts with his lettering and comic hero renderings.

Exhibitions

Solo shows
1982, 1983, 1985 : The Yaki Kornblitt Gallery, Amsterdam
1983 : Stellweg-Seguy gallery, New York City
1985 : Suntory company, Tokyo
1995 : Clayton Gallery, New York City
2001 : Twenty-four Gallery, Vancouver. Bob's Gallery, New York City
2003 : Toy Tokyo Gallery, New York City. STIP Gallery, Amsterdam. Stussy SF Gallery, San Francisco. Concrete Vibes Gallery, New York City. Marco Art Gallery, New York City
2005 : Rocket World Gallery, San Francisco. Outside Institute Space, Londres. Prosper Gallery, Tokyo. Mc Caigwelles Gallery, New York City
2006 : Stolen Space gallery, London
2007 : Seen City, Galerie Chappe, Paris
2009 : The 1st SEEN Pop-Up Show, Lyon
2009 : Carhartt Gallery, Weil am Rhein
2009 : Kleerup Gallery, Stockholm
2010 : PleaSE ENjoy @ Magda Danysz Gallery, Paris
2011 : Seen, Opera Gallery, Paris

Bibliography

References

External links 

 BlkMarket – some of Seen's artwork
 UA @ 149st
 Interview with Seen Radio France Internationale
 The Cornell Hip Hop Collection preserves 149 of Seen's original drawings and 370 original photographs of his work

American graffiti artists
Living people
1961 births